Keilira is a genus of Australian huntsman spiders that was first described by D. B. Hirst in 1989.  it contains two species, found in South Australia and Victoria: K. sokoli and K. sparsomaculata.

See also
 List of Sparassidae species

References

Araneomorphae genera
Sparassidae
Spiders of Australia